Paula Wilson (born December 17, 1975) is an African-American "mixed media" artist creating works examining women's identities through a lens of cultural history. She uses sculpture, collage, painting, installation, and printmaking methods such as silkscreen, lithography, and woodblock. In 2007 Wilson moved from Brooklyn, New York, to Carrizozo, New Mexico (population 996), where she currently lives and works with her woodworking partner Mike Lagg.

Early life

Paula Wilson was born in Chicago and grew up in Hyde Park on the south side of the city, where her father, William Julius Wilson, was a professor of sociology at the University of Chicago. Her mother, Beverly Ann Wilson, is an artist and bookbinder.

Education

Wilson attended Washington University in St. Louis from 1994 to 1998, earning her B.F.A. and graduating summa cum laude. She earned her M.F.A. from Columbia University.

Life and work

Wilson is known for her monumental and tactile work describing narratives and environments that fit her experience as a biracial black woman. She reimagines art historical tropes and inserts versions of herself into the landscape and canon. Shifting between graphic and painterly representations, she builds narratives by collapsing pictorial planes.  Wilson’s work is anchored in self-portrait, printmaking, installation, and collage. She prints images with wood blocks, silkscreens, intaglio, and monotypes; layers acrylic, oil, and spray paint; shoots videos inserting 2-D work into the landscape; she cuts, glues, and stitches to make colorful, dense assemblages. Her works often burst from their wall or frame, reflecting a constant re-assembly of lived experiences: black and white, urban and rural, traditional and contemporary, singular and collective.

Wilson is co-founder of the artist organizations MoMAZoZo (founded in 2010) and the Carrizozo Artist in Residency (AIR)(founded in 2016).

Academia 

Wilson was a Visiting Critic at Yale School of Art from 2005 to 2007  and an assistant professor at Columbia University School of the Arts from 2007 to 2008. In 2015. she served as the Louis D. Beaumont Artist-in-Residence & Visiting Assistant Professor in the College and Graduate School of Art in the Sam Fox School of Design & Visual Arts at Washington University in St. Louis. She has been a visiting artist at many institutions and universities nationally.

 Visiting Artist, Oberlin College, Oberlin, Ohio, 2020
 Visiting Artists, Cranbrook Academy of Art, Bloomfield Hills, Michigan, 2020
 Visiting Lecturer, Pennsylvania Academy of the Fine Arts, Philadelphia, Pennsylvania, 2017
 Visiting Lecturer, Pratt Institute, Brooklyn, New York, 2017
 Visiting Artist, Boston University, Boston, Massachusetts, 2016

Solo exhibitions 

 2000–"What's So Personal," The Butcher Shop, Chicago, Illinois 
 2006–"Paintings and Drawings from the Hanno Valley," Galleria Suzy Shammah, Milan, Italy 
 2008–"The Stained Glass Ceiling," Bellwether Gallery, New York, New York
 2010–"First Story," The Fabric Workshop and Museum, Philadelphia, Pennsylvania
 2014–"Undress," Center for Contemporary Arts, Spector Ripps Project Space, Santa Fe, New Mexico
 2015–"Back it Up," Museum Blue, St. Louis, Missouri
 2015–"Salty & Fresh," Cherry & Lucic, Portland, Oregon
 2017–"Salty & Fresh," Emerson Dorsch Gallery, Miami, Florida
 2017–"Paula Wilson:The Backward Glance," Bemis Center for Contemporary Art, Omaha, Nebraska
 2018–"FLOORED," HOLDING Contemporary, Portland, Oregon
 2018–"PIECESCAPE," Visitor Welcome Center, Los Angeles, California
 2018–"Spread Wild: Pleasures of the Yucca," Smack Mellon, Brooklyn, New York
 2018–"The Light Becomes You," Denny Dimin Gallery, New York, New York
 2019–"Entangled," 516 ARTS, Albuquerque, New Mexico

Selected group exhibitions 

 2019–"Contemporary Performance," curated by Kalup Linzy, Florida Museum of Photographic Art, Tampa, Florida 
 2019–"Fragment," Emerson Dorsch Gallery, Miami, Florida
 2019–"In This Body of Mine: Strange Fire Collective at the Milwaukee Institute of Art & Design," Milwaukee, Wisconsin  
 2019–"20 and Odd: The 400-Year Anniversary of 1619," curated by Kalia Brooks Nelson, Leroy Neiman Gallery, Columbia University, New York, New York 
 2017–"Sunrise, Sunset," Emerson Dorsch Gallery, Miami, Florida  
 2017–"The Unhomely," Denny Gallery, New York, New York   
 2017–"The Young Years, The Frances Young Tang Teaching Museum and Art Gallery at Skidmore College," curated by Dayton Director Ian Berry, Saratoga Springs, New York
 2016–"Surface Area: Selections from the Permanent Collection,"Studio Museum in Harlem, New York, New York 
 2016–"Residency," form & concept, Santa Fe, New Mexico  
 2016–"Visions Into Infinite Archives," SOMArts Cultural Center, curated by Black Salt Collective, San Francisco, California    
 2015–DRAW: Mapping Madness, Inside – Out Art Museum, curated by Tomas Vu, Beijing, China 2014    
 2013–"I Am The Magic Hand," Sikkema Jenkins & Co, Organized by Josephine Halvorson, New York, New York 
 2013– "Sanctify," Vincent Price Museum, Los Angeles, California 
 2012–"The Bearden Project," Studio Museum in Harlem, New York, New York 
 2012–"Configured," Benrimon Contemporary, Curated By Teka Selman, New York, New York 
 2011–"Art by Choice," Mississippi Museum of Art, Jackson, Mississippi 
 2011–"The February Show," Ogilvy & Mather, New York, New York 
 2010–"Art on Paper: The 41st Exhibition," Weatherspoon Art Museum, Greensboro, North Carolina
 2010–"Defrosted: A Life of Walt Disney," Postmasters Gallery, New York, New York 
 2010–"41st Collectors Show," Arkansas Art Center, Little Rock, Arkansas
 2009–"Carrizozo Artist’s Show," Gallery 408, Carrizozo, New Mexico 
 2009–"While We Were Away," Sragow Gallery, New York, New York 
 2009–"A Decade of Contemporary American Printmaking: 1999–2009," Tsingha University, Beijing, China 
 2009–"Collected. Propositions on the Permanent Collection," Studio Museum in Harlem, New York, New York 
 2009–"Cinema Remixed and Reloaded: Black Women Artists and the Moving Image Since 1970," Contemporary Arts Museum Houston, Houston, Texas 
 2007–"Cinema Remixed and Reloaded: Black Women Artists and the Moving Image Since 1970," Spelman College Museum of Fine Art, Atlanta, Georgia 
 2007–"Horizon," EFA Gallery, Curated by David Humphrey, New York, New York 
 2007–"Black Alphabet, contexts of Contemporary African American Art," Zacheta National Gallery of Art, Warsaw, Poland
 2006–"Turn the Beat Around," Sikkema Jenkins & Co., New York, New York 
 2006–"The Manhattan Project," Fred Snitzer Gallery, Miami, Florida 
 2006–"Frequency," Studio Museum in Harlem, New York, New York 
 2005–"MFA Thesis Exhibition," Studebaker Building, Curated by Jeffrey Uslip, New York, New York 
 2005–"Recess: Images & Objects in Formation," Rush Gallery, Curated by Derek Adams, New York, New York 
 2004–"Past Perfect," Kantor/Feuer Gallery, New York, New York 
 2004–"After Goya," Leroy Neiman Gallery, Columbia University, Curated by Tomas Vu Daniel, New York, New York 
 2004–"Hungry Eyes, First Year MFA Exhibition," Columbia University, Ira D. Wallach Gallery, New York, New York 
 2002–"Signs," Public Art Installation, Chicago, Illinois 
 2001–"Brat(Wurst): A Show of Chicago Artists," Vox Populi, Philadelphia, Pennsylvania 
 2000–"Young Love," Mapreed Gallery, Los Angeles, California

Personal life 
Wilson currently lives and works in Carrizozo, New Mexico with her partner, woodworker Mike Lagg.

Recognition 

Wilson has been featured in publications such as Hyperallergic, Artforum, The New York Times, The Brooklyn Rail, and The New Yorker.

Wilson received the Award of Distinction from Washington University’s Sam Fox School of Design & Visual Arts, in St. Louis in 2019. She has been awarded residencies at the Fabric Workshop and Museum (2009–2010), Vermont Studio Center, and the Giverny Residency from the Art Production Fund in Giverny, France. She has also received a place on the short list, Joyce Alexander Wein Artist Prize, Studio Museum in Harlem, 2007 and the Milovich Award in Painting, School of Art, Washington University, 1998.

External links

References 

American multimedia artists
1975 births
Living people
African-American contemporary artists
African-American women artists
American contemporary artists
American women printmakers
Columbia University School of the Arts alumni
Washington University in St. Louis alumni
Washington University in St. Louis faculty
Sam Fox School of Design & Visual Arts alumni
Artists from Chicago
Artists from Illinois
21st-century American printmakers
21st-century American women artists
People from Lincoln County, New Mexico
African-American printmakers